Patrick McCarthy MBE is a Northern Irish Social Democratic and Labour Party (SDLP) politician and former member of Belfast City Council.

Born and raised in the Markets area of Belfast, McCarthy was interned without trial in 1971 on suspicion of being a member of the Official IRA, before being released in 1972.

First elected to the council in 2001 for Laganbank he was chosen as Lord Mayor of Belfast in 2006. McCarthy, the city's fourth nationalist mayor, was endorsed by all parties except Sinn Féin. He successfully represented the SDLP on Belfast City council until 2014.

Following nominations from church and community groups across the sectarian divide McCarthy was appointed MBE for Political and Community Cohesion in the 2016 New Year Honours.

MacCarthy stood for election to the National Executive of Fianna Fáil and has been a longstanding advocate for Fianna Fáil in Northern Ireland.

References

Year of birth missing (living people)
Living people
Lord Mayors of Belfast
Members of Belfast City Council
Social Democratic and Labour Party politicians
Members of the Order of the British Empire
Irish republicans interned without trial